Handwara Assembly constituency is one of the 87 constituencies in the Jammu and Kashmir Legislative Assembly of Jammu and Kashmir a north state of India. Handwara is also part of Baramulla Lok Sabha constituency.

Member of Legislative Assembly

 1962: Abdul Gani Mir, Independent
 1967: Abdul Gani Lone, Indian National Congress
 1972: Abdul Gani Lone, Indian National Congress
 1977: Abdul Gani Lone, Janata Party
 1983: Chowdry Mohamad Ramzan, Jammu & Kashmir National Conference
 1987: Chowdry Mohamad Ramzan, Jammu & Kashmir National Conference
 1996: Chowdry Mohamad Ramzan, Jammu & Kashmir National Conference
 2002: Gh.Mohi-Ud-Din Sofi, Independent
 2008: Chowdary Mohmad Ramzan, Jammu & Kashmir National Conference

Election results

2014

See also

 Handwara
 Kupwara district
 List of constituencies of Jammu and Kashmir Legislative Assembly

References

Assembly constituencies of Jammu and Kashmir
Kupwara district